Cruit Island ( or Oileán na Cruite) is a small inhabited island in the Rosses region of County Donegal, Ireland. It is linked to the mainland by bridge.

Culture
Cruit Island has a strong musical heritage. Local musician Seán McBride wrote the Irish ballad "The Homes of Donegal" in 1955. The song "Thíos Cois na Trá Domh" originates from the island and remains a popular song in the Donegal Gaeltacht to this day.

Demographics

References

Climbing areas of Ireland
Gaeltacht places in County Donegal
Islands of County Donegal
The Rosses